Ana Dias (born 15 July 1984) is a Portuguese photographer, best known for her photography for Playboy magazine.

Life and work
Ana Dias was born in Porto, Portugal, in 1984. She graduated from the Porto Superior School of Art in fine arts, specializing in drawing, in 2007.  Having finished her education, she started teaching serigraphy, lithography and engraving at that institution. Her background in fine arts led her to photography, which came to be her primary way of artistic expression. As a photographer she works mainly with erotic femininity.

In 2012 she was a winner in the Fotoerotika Konkurs, organized by the Serbian edition of Playboy magazine, and her work was published in the magazine. In November 2012 she photographed the model Raquel Henriques for her first cover of the Portuguese edition of Playboy. Ana Dias earned a reputation and Playboy invitations from around the world: South Africa,  Germany, Netherlands, France, Russia, Brazil, Mexico, Thailand among many others. She is the only Portuguese photographer with a career in Playboy Enterprises International, regularly collaborating with editions of the magazine in more than 20 countries.

In June 2015 Ana Dias was invited to star in her own web series entitled Playboy Abroad: Adventures with Photographer Ana Dias. In each of the 24 episodes, she traveled to a different country to photograph a different model for a Playboy-style photo shoot. The web series featured the backstage of the photo shoots, as well as the adventures of the photographer with the models and her team.

On 4 August 2019, an image of Ana Dias photographing a Playboy model appeared on the front page of The New York Times.

In addition to Playboy, her work as a photographer has been published in other men's magazines, such as FHM, Maxim and INSOMNIA Magazine.

Exhibitions 
Playboy World, Théâtre Mansart (France), September 2017; Casino Tróia (Portugal), August 2017; Casino Figueira (Portugal), June 2017; Casino Lisboa (Portugal), January 2017.
Uma Viagem ao Mundo Playboy, Espaço Mude (Portugal), May 2017.

References

External links

1984 births
Living people
People from Porto
Portuguese photographers
Portuguese women photographers
Playboy photographers